"Centuries of Folk of Silver Herds" was a Mongolian folk song that was the national anthem of the Bogd Khanate of Mongolia. After the establishment of Mongolia in 1911, Bogd Khan chose the song "Zuun Lang Joroo Luus" as the national anthem in 1915 and it served in such a capacity until 1924 when it was replaced by the Mongol Internationale.

History 
The origin of the name comes from the idea that mule is considered as the vehicle of God, and that mule is worth a hundred lang and is a special vehicle. The song was originally a religious hymn.

During the time of Bogd Khanate Mongolia, there was a folk song called "Zuun lang joroo luus" as a national anthem. At that time, when Prime Minister Tögs-Ochiryn Namnansüren went to Russia for talks on military affairs, where he saw for the first time military bands performing at ceremonies. He liked the sound of this music, which gave him cause to bring brass instruments back home with a Russian musical expert, who selected 10 people from Bogd Khan's army and taught them how to play the instruments. At the same time, the Russian exploration team arrived in Mongolia and visited the Winter Palace of the Bogd Khan and paid tribute to the monarch, before making a request to the Russian ambassador, to create a national anthem for the Khanate. Andrey Vyacheslavovich Kadlec, a Czech-born Russian composer and principal violinist of the Mariinsky Theatre in Saint Petersburg, was commissioned to compose a "National Anthem of Mongolia". He was given the melody of a song by the Institute of Oriental Studies of the Russian Academy of Sciences at that time, which was "Zuun Lang Joroo Mulus". Subsequently, it became the National Anthem of Bogd Khant Mongolia in 1915.

From 1914-1924, the anthem was sung in religious and state ceremonies. After that, the song Mongol Internationale composed in 1922 was played by the musicians of the State Central Theater not only at ceremonies, but also at the beginning and end of Mongolian radio broadcasts.

Lyrics

References 

Historical national anthems
History of Mongolia
1915 songs
National symbols of Mongolia
Mongolian music
Mongolia (1911–1924)